Fallahi may refer to:
Valiollah Fallahi, a military leader